Zack Robidas is an American actor known for his roles in Succession, Friends from College, and Sorry for Your Loss. Also a theatre actor, Robidas co-starred in Pretty Theft by Adam Szymkowicz.

Robidas is a native of Berks County, Pennsylvania and graduated from DeSales University in Center Valley, Pennsylvania. He was married to soap opera actress Marnie Schulenburg from 2013 until her death from breast cancer on May 17, 2022. They have one child, Coda, who was born December 12, 2019.

Filmography

Film

Television

Stage

Video games

References

External links 

Living people
People from Berks County, Pennsylvania
DeSales University alumni
Year of birth missing (living people)